Chakri Railway bridge is a three-span railway bridge in Thailand, with the parallel bridge. It is situated in Phra Nakhon Si Ayutthaya Province on the Northern Line Railway. There are three span, length 103 metres. The parallel bridge is three-span bridge too.

Features
It is a three-span truss bridge. Its length is 103 metres. The parallel bridge is three-span bridge too.

References

External links
 Photos of the bridge (2007) 

Railway bridges in Thailand
Bridges completed in 1948
Bridges completed in 2004
Truss bridges